The Siemens SL45 was the first mobile phone with memory expansion and an MP3 player, which debuted in 2001. An improved version, the SL45i, was also the first phone to have a Java virtual machine.

In addition to the MP3 player, SL45 offered other advanced features such as dictaphone with several hours of recording time, auto responder, voice dialing and voice commands, WAP browser, and context sensitive help in several languages.
Other software include calendar/organizer, alarm clock, stopwatch, calculator, currency converter and games. While the SL45 was one of the most advanced phones in its time, it was also one of the smallest.

Versions 
The Siemens SL45 came in three versions:
 Siemens SL45 - original edition, with a 32 MB memory card, sync station and stereo headphones in the package
 Siemens SL42 - a cheaper version introduced later, with a 16 MB memory card and no sync station or headphones
 Siemens SL45i - a version with a new firmware with Java support, and a slightly stronger battery

These three phones are electronically identical, and the SL45i's firmware can be installed in the SL42 and SL45, thus enhancing them with a Java virtual machine.

Features and specifications 

 Physical dimensions
 Dimensions: 105 mm x 46 mm x 17 mm
 Weight: 88 g
 Processor
 Siemens/Infineon C166
 13 MHz during standard operation and MP3 playback
 26 MHz when Java midlet running
 Battery
 Li-Ion 540 mAh (SL42 and SL45)
 up to 170 hours of standby
 up to approx. 5 hours of audio playback
 up to 240 minutes of conversation
 Li-Ion 650 mAh (SL45i)
 up to 230 hours of standby
 up to 330 minutes of conversation
 Communication
 dual-band GSM: EGSM 900 MHz / GSM 1800 MHz
 support for SMS sending and receiving
 WAP 1.1 through CSD
 CLID functionality
 conference call support
 Memory
 MultiMediaCard slot
 32 MB card included (SL45 and SL45i)
 16 MB card included (SL42)
 known to work with at least 1 GB cards
 Display
 graphic monochrome, 101 x 80 pixel
 can contain up to 7 lines of text
 orange backlight
 Sound
 monophonic ringtone support
 39 standard ringtones
 up to 3 custom ringtones in internal memory
 ringtone composer
 reads ringtones in standard MIDI file format from memory card
 MP3 digital audio file player with ID3 tag support, through headset only
 voice memo and voice notice
 Other features
 personal information manager
 address and phone book with up to 500 entries (plus SIM card capacity)
 date and time functionality
 stopwatch
 alarm clock, reminder list
 calculator
 T9 system for SMS writing
 vibration alert
 up to 7 user-defined sound/vibration profiles
 quick dial
 voice dial
 call filtering
 4 integrated games
 3 internal language versions + language files on memory card
 Java functionality (SL45i firmware only)
 Java ME/MIDP support
 proprietary Siemens extensions
 Computer interoperability
 Serial (COM) port
 IrDA port
 Microsoft Outlook synchronization

Criticism 
The SL45 series was a professional model and thus very highly priced at the time of release. It was sometimes criticized for its bugginess, particularly in that simply sending too many SMSs could cause the phone to crash, and for being relatively delicate - there are many known issues of vibration alert, or MP3 player control buttons on the side of the case stopping functioning after phone fall.

Firmware 
The SL42, SL45 and SL45i share the same electronic components, and thus firmware can be exchanged between them. It can enhance functionality of SL42 and SL45 with Java support. Relatively simple structure of the firmware code, and the ease of new firmware installation (standard serial cable included in the box is suitable) led to many custom firmware modifications (more than 300 patches) sprung over the Internet. These correct software bugs, change the phone's graphics, or even add new functionality like key remapping, calling pictures, or detailed battery information, and even up to 15 virtual SIM-cards (user must reboot phone to select virtual SIM from list).

User base 
Due to the above-mentioned firmware enhanceability, availability of many Java applications further enhancing the feature set (with, for example, sending of long SMS messages, e-book reading, video playing, and E-mail client functionality), MP3 player functionality and memory card slot, and also for being fairly priced after a few years since its release, the SL45 series gained a huge user base, constantly developing new firmware patches, Java applications and hardware modifications, enhancing the phone's functionality. Many fans of the model claim that there is no mobile phone which can replace the SL45i (either the original one, or SL42/45 enhanced with SL45i firmware) for them.

The phone is indeed very versatile and has a huge feature set, especially when compared to other phones of its time, although it lacks many features now considered standard for modern phones, like colour display, integrated camera, polyphonic or digitized ringtones, Bluetooth and GPRS functionality. Modern phones with memory card support also can be natively connected to a computer's USB port, greatly improving transfer speeds when compared to the SL45's serial connection; this limitation can be, however, omitted by using a third-party memory card reader.

References

SL45
Mobile phones with infrared transmitter
Mobile phones introduced in 2001